He's Just Not That Into You is a 2009 American romantic comedy-drama film directed by Ken Kwapis, based on Greg Behrendt and Liz Tuccillo's 2004 self-help book of the same name. It follows nine people and their varying romantic problems. Gigi, a common thread amongst the characters, is followed more closely than the other eight and has a more developed storyline as she consistently misreads all of her romantic partners' behaviors. She meets Alex, who helps her to interpret signs given to her by her dates.

The ensemble cast includes Ben Affleck, Jennifer Aniston, Drew Barrymore, Jennifer Connelly, Kevin Connolly, Bradley Cooper, Ginnifer Goodwin, Scarlett Johansson, Kris Kristofferson, and Justin Long. The film was produced by New Line Cinema and Flower Films, the production company owned by Barrymore, who was executive producer.

Production began in Baltimore in 2007. The film was released on February 6, 2009 by Warner Bros. Pictures to mixed reviews. It grossed $27,785,487 on its opening weekend and over $178,866,158 worldwide.

Plot

Gigi, Conor and Alex
In Baltimore, Gigi repeatedly misreads the romantic interest of her dates.

Following a tepid date with real estate agent Conor Barry, Gigi is befriended by bar owner Alex, who suggests she misinterprets romantic signals. As their friendship continues, Gigi interprets his helpfulness as a sign he is attracted to her, but Alex rebuffs her, chastising her for ignoring his advice.

As Gigi moves on from Alex, he realizes he is in love with her. After leaving several unanswered messages, Alex arrives at Gigi's apartment after she returns from a pleasant date, and declares his love and they end up kissing.

Janine, Ben, and Anna
Gigi's co-worker, Janine Gunders, obsesses over her home renovations while her husband, Ben, becomes attracted to Anna Marks, a yoga instructor and aspiring singer. Ben and Anna pursue a flirtatious friendship under the pretense of him helping her establish a singing career. Ben reveals that he only married Janine after she delivered an ultimatum, saying that they should marry or break up. Ben agrees to only be friends with Anna, but she continues her pursuit until they sleep together.

Finding cigarette butts hidden in the back yard, Janine accuses Ben of smoking again, citing her father's death from lung cancer for her anger. Ben blames the workmen at their house. During a tense home improvement shopping trip, Ben confesses his infidelity. Devastated, Janine blames herself and wants to save their marriage; Ben seems less enthusiastic.

Later, Anna and Ben begin having sex in his office, when he gropes and strips her to her lingerie. They are interrupted by Janine, who arrives hoping to spice up their marriage. Forced to hide in a closet and listen as Ben and Janine have sex, Anna afterward leaves in disgust, ending her affair with Ben. As Janine tidies up Ben's clothes at home, she discovers a pack of cigarettes and explodes in anger. When Ben returns home, Janine is gone, leaving his clothes folded on the staircase with a carton of cigarettes and a note asking for a divorce. Janine moves into an apartment to restart her life, and Anna is seen performing at an upscale nightclub. Alone, Ben buys beer at the same supermarket where he met Anna.

Conor, Anna, and Mary
Anna enjoys a close friendship with Alex's friend, Conor. Though Anna wants a casual relationship, Conor misinterprets her playful affection as romantic interest.

Anna's friend, Mary Harris, works in advertising sales for a local gay newspaper and helps Conor promote his real estate business. Like Gigi, she meets many men, mostly online, but despite constantly monitoring her emails, pager, phone, and Myspace messages, her dates go nowhere.

While Conor attempts to cultivate a gay clientele, two gay men explain how he is going wrong with Anna. Taking their advice, Conor declares his love to Anna. Feeling vulnerable after her falling out with Ben, Anna agrees to a more serious relationship. When Conor later proposes buying a house and moving in together, Anna admits she does not want to and they return to being just friends.

Mary later runs into Conor, recognizing him from his ad photo and having only spoken to him over the phone. They hit it off, and start dating.

Beth and Neil
Gigi's co-worker, Beth Murphy, lives with her boyfriend Neil, a friend of Ben's. After seven years together, Beth wants to get married, but Neil opposes marriage. Gigi announces she will no longer misinterpret vague gestures and comments, and says that men who delay marrying likely never intend to. This spurs Beth to confront Neil, who remains adamant that he never wants to marry, and she breaks up with him.

Preparations for her younger sister's wedding reopen the issue after Beth hears backhanded comments from various family members. During the reception, her father Ken suffers a heart attack. Beth cares for him as he recuperates at home while her sisters wallow and their husbands remain glued to the television with constant takeout food, while refusing to help at all. Beth's patience wanes as the household grows more dysfunctional and the chores start to file. However, just when she's about to snap, she is shocked to find Neil, who learned of her father's heart attack and rushed over, finishing the dishes in a now clean kitchen, done the laundry, and restocked the fridge. They reconcile, with Beth assuring Neil that she wants him back without being married. Neil later proposes, and they wed aboard his sailboat.

Cast

Production
Baltimore, Maryland, was selected for the setting of He's Just Not That Into You as an alternative to the common New York City, Chicago, or Los Angeles settings of romantic comedies. In addition, screenwriter Marc Silverstein had lived in the city for several years prior to attending college. Exterior shots were filmed in the city for two weeks during November 2007. Interior scenes were filmed in Los Angeles.

The film was released on February 6, 2009, by Warner Bros. Pictures.

Reception

Box office
In its opening weekend, the film earned $27.8 million, topping the box office. Its total US gross amounted to $93,953,653 while internationally it grossed $84.4 million, bringing the worldwide gross to $178.4 million against a $40 million budget.

Critical response
On Rotten Tomatoes, the film has an approval rating of 41% from critics based on 169 reviews, with an average rating of 5.2/10. The website's critics consensus reads, "Despite the best efforts of a talented cast, He's Just Not That Into You devotes too little time to each of its protagonists, thus reducing them to stereotypes." On Metacritic the film has a weighted average score of 47 out of 100 based on 32 reviews, indicating "mixed or average reviews". Audiences surveyed by CinemaScore gave the film a grade B+ on scale of A to F.

John Anderson of Variety wrote: "No one has anything to distract them from the minutiae of their love lives, which they proceed to incinerate through overanalysis. It's a moral fable, maybe, if you make half a million a year." Peter Travers of Rolling Stone wrote: "Here's a true S&M date movie. Only sadistic men and masochistic women could love it." Peter Bradshaw of The Guardian called the film "an unendurable relationship-romcom, which you should avoid the way you would a glass of punch with a frothy gob of Anthrax floating on the surface."

While Manohla Dargis of The New York Times recognized a few "nice moments" throughout, she overall denounced it as a "grotesque representation of female desire" which now seems largely "reserved for shoes, wedding bells and babies". Moira Macdonald of The Seattle Times heavily criticized Kwapis's characters, "these aren't people, they're pages from self-help manuals", making them "hard to care about".

Accolades

Home media
The DVD and Blu-ray Disc was released on June 2, 2009. The Blu-ray version of the release includes a digital copy. It has grossed $26,350,178 in US DVD sales. The film was sold to E! for 4% of the film's domestic box office (~$3.6 million) for television broadcast after the opportunity passed for the USA Network and HBO to pick it up.

Music

Soundtrack 

The soundtrack album was released on March 10, 2009, by New Line Records.

 "I'd Like To" – Corinne Bailey Rae (4:06)
 "I'm Amazed" – My Morning Jacket (4:34)
 "Don't You Want Me" – The Human League (3:57)
 "Supernatural Superserious" – R.E.M. (3:24)
 "Madly" – Tristan Prettyman (3:18)
 "This Must Be the Place (Naive Melody)" – Talking Heads (4:55)
 "By Your Side" – The Black Crowes (4:29)
 "Buscando Olvidar" – Alfred Gómez Jr. (3:48)
 "I Must Be High" – Wilco (2:59)
 "Sweet Sixteen Bars" – Michael Pewny and Torsten Zwingenberger (3:06)
 "You Make It Real" – James Morrison (3:32)
 "If I Never See Your Face Again" – Maroon 5 (3:19)
 "Can't Hardly Wait" – The Replacements (3:04)
 "Fruit Machine" – The Ting Tings (2:53)
 "Smile" – Lily Allen (3:15)
 "Somewhere Only We Know" – Keane (3:57)
 "Love, Save the Empty" – Erin McCarley (3:17)
 "Friday I'm in Love" – The Cure (3:35)
 "Last Goodbye" – Scarlett Johansson (2:32)
 "He's Into Me" – Cliff Eidelman (2:24)

Notes
 Although Scarlett Johansson is seen singing in her last scene of the film, the song she performs is not actually heard.
 Eidelman's score cue is not included on the physical song CD; it is only part of its download release.

Score

The score for He's Just Not That Into You was composed by Cliff Eidelman, who recorded his score with an 80-piece ensemble of the Hollywood Studio Symphony at the Newman Scoring Stage. New Line Records released a score album.

 "Prologue/The Signs" – 2:39
 "Mixed Messages" – 0:57
 "This Other Woman" – 1:19
 "Not to Be Trusted" – 1:55
 "No Exceptions" – 2:05
 "Sailing" – 1:27
 "The Love of Your Life" – 1:16
 "Are You Going to Marry Me" – 1:32
 "Mary at the Blade" – 0:42
 "The Pool" – 1:12
 "He's Into Me" – 2:24
 "You Don't Fall in Love That Way" – 2:07
 "Tables Turn on Alex" – 0:56
 "Janine Revealed" – 2:43
 "Beth's New Day" – 1:38
 "Anna's Truth" – 0:54
 "Will You Marry Me" – 3:07
 "End Credit Suite" – 3:03

References

External links

 
 
 
 

2000s sex comedy films
2009 films
2009 romantic comedy-drama films
American romantic comedy-drama films
American sex comedy films
2000s English-language films
Films based on non-fiction books
Films directed by Ken Kwapis
Films scored by Cliff Eidelman
Films set in Baltimore
Films shot in Baltimore
Films shot in Los Angeles
Films shot in Portland, Oregon
Flower Films films
New Line Cinema films
Warner Bros. films
2000s American films